Panacanthus is a genus of nocturnal, predatory, coneheads, found in the Ecuadorian Amazon rainforests, such as in Yasuní National Park. None of the species in this genus are listed by the IUCN. The species in this genus are characterized by their spike-covered bodies, which allow it to blend in with the vegetation on which it lives, and discourage potential predators. The common names spiny-headed katydid, spine-headed katydids, spike-headed katydids, thorny devil katydid, thorny devil bush cricket, and similar variations of the sort, do not apply to a single species, and multiple species are often called by the same common name.

Phylogeny 

Panacanthus includes the following extant species:
 Panacanthus cuspidatus (Bolívar, 1881)
 Panacanthus gibbosus Montealegre-Z. & Morris, 2004
 Panacanthus intensus Montealegre-Z. & Morris, 2004
 Panacanthus lacrimans Montealegre-Z. & Morris, 2004
 Panacanthus pallicornis (Walker, 1869)
 Panacanthus spinosus Redtenbacher, 1891
 Panacanthus varius Walker, 1869 - type species

Description 
‘’Panacanthus’’ has six spiny legs that is uses for defense. The legs help fight off enemies and trap prey. They are able to camouflage among the leafy tropical trees because of their unique green color. Even though they do not have teeth, they are able to shred flesh with the bite of their sharp mouth parts. Their size ranges from 2.5-3 inches (6-8 cm) long.

References 

Tettigoniidae genera
Conocephalinae